Kazemabad (also Romanized as Kāz̧emābād) is a village in Shaban Rural District, in the Central District of Meshgin Shahr County, Ardabil Province, Iran. At the 2006 census, its population was 199, in 41 families.

References 

Tageo

Towns and villages in Meshgin Shahr County